In molecular biology, Small nucleolar RNA R30/Z108 (snoR30) is a C/D box small nucleolar RNA that acts as a methylation guide for 18S ribosomal RNA in plants.

References

External links 
 

Small nuclear RNA